The 2016 FFA Cup preliminary rounds were the qualifying competition to decide 21 of the 32 teams which took part in the 2016 FFA Cup Round of 32, along with the 10 A-League clubs and reigning National Premier Leagues champion (Blacktown City FC). The preliminary rounds operated within a consistent national structure whereby club entry into the competition was staggered in each state/territory, with the winning clubs from Round 7 of the preliminary rounds in each member federation gaining entry into the Round of 32. All Australian clubs were eligible to enter the qualifying process through their respective FFA member federation, however only one team per club was permitted entry in the competition.

Schedule

The number of fixtures for each round, and the match dates for each Federation, were as follows.

  Some round dates in respective Federations overlapped due to separate scheduling of Zones/Sub-Zones.

Format
The preliminary rounds structures are as follows, and refer to the different levels in the unofficial Australian association football league system :

Qualifying round:
50 Victorian clubs level 8 and below entered this stage.
Byes – 6 VIC clubs.
First round:
11 Northern New South Wales clubs level 4 and below entered this stage.
10 Queensland clubs entered this stage.
88 Victorian clubs (22 from the previous round and 66 level 6–8) entered this stage.
18 Western Australian level 6 and below entered this stage.
Byes – 1 NNSW club and 6 QLD clubs.
Second round:
63 Northern New South Wales clubs (6 from the previous round and 57 level 3 and below) entered this stage.
71 Queensland clubs (8 from the previous round and 63 level 3 and below) entered this stage. The Brisbane-based losers from this round also qualified to the First Round of the linked Canale Cup competition.
16 South Australian clubs level 4 and below entered at this stage.
80 Victorian clubs (44 from the previous round and 36 level 5–6) entered this stage.
22 Western Australian clubs (9 from the previous round and 13 level 5 and below) entered this stage.
Byes – 1 NNSW club, 8 QLD clubs and 2 SA clubs.
Third round:
11 Australian Capital Territory clubs level 3–4 entered this stage. 
108 New South Wales clubs level 4 and below entered this stage.
45 Northern New South Wales clubs (32 from the previous round and 13 level 2 and below) entered this stage.
75 Queensland clubs (38 from the previous round and 37 new teams) entered this stage.
9 Northern Territory clubs level 2 and below from the Norzone (DAR) entered at this stage.
32 South Australian clubs (9 from the previous round and 23 level 2–3) entered this stage.
6 Tasmanian clubs level 3 entered at this stage
64 Victorian clubs (40 from the previous round and 24 level 4) entered this stage.
34 Western Australian clubs (11 from the previous round and 23 level 3–4) entered this stage. 
Byes – 5 ACT clubs, 8 NSW clubs, 3 NNSW clubs, 7 NT clubs and 1 QLD club.
Fourth round:
16 Australian Capital Territory clubs (8 from the previous round and 8 level 2) entered this stage.
80 New South Wales clubs (58 from the previous round and 22 level 2 and below) entered this stage.
24 Northern New South Wales clubs progressed to this stage.
13 Northern Territory clubs (8 from the previous round and 5 level 2 and below from the Southern Zone (ASP)) entered at this stage.
43 Queensland clubs (38 from the previous round and 5 new teams) entered this stage. The 10 Brisbane-based winners also qualify to the Fifth Round of the separate Canale Cup competition.
16 South Australian clubs progressed to this stage.
16 Tasmanian clubs (3 from the previous round and 13 level 2–3) entered at this stage.
64 Victorian clubs (32 from the previous round and 32 level 2–3) entered this stage.
24 Western Australian clubs (17 from the previous round and 7 level 2) entered this stage. 
Byes – 3 NT clubs and 1 QLD club.
Fifth round:
8 Australian Capital Territory clubs progressed to this stage.
40 New South Wales clubs progressed to this stage.
12 Northern New South Wales clubs progressed to this stage.
8 Northern Territory clubs will progress to this stage.
32 Queensland clubs (21 from the previous round and 11 level 2) entered this stage.
8 South Australian clubs progressed to this stage.
8 Tasmanian clubs progressed to this stage.
32 Victorian clubs progressed to this stage.
16 Western Australian clubs (12 from the previous round and 4 level 2) entered this stage.
Byes – 4 NNSW clubs.
Sixth round:
4 Australian Capital Territory clubs progressed to this stage.
20 New South Wales clubs progressed to this stage.
8 Northern New South Wales clubs progressed to this stage.
4 Northern Territory clubs progressed to this stage.
16 Queensland clubs progressed to this stage.
4 South Australian clubs progressed to this stage.
4 Tasmanian clubs progressed to this stage.
16 Victorian clubs progressed to this stage.
8 Western Australian clubs progressed to this stage.
Seventh round:
2 Australian Capital Territory clubs progressed to this stage, which doubled as the Final of the Federation Cup.
10 New South Wales clubs progressed to this stage. The 5 winners – along with the reigning National Premier Leagues champion Blacktown City – also participated in the Waratah Cup.
4 Northern New South Wales clubs progressed to this stage.
2 Northern Territory clubs progressed to this stage – the winners of the Darwin-based and Alice Springs-based knockout competitions – which doubled as the final of the Sport Minister's Cup.
8 Queensland clubs progressed to this stage.
2 South Australian clubs progressed to this stage, which doubled as the Grand Final of the Federation Cup.
2 Tasmanian clubs progressed to this stage, which doubled as the Grand Final of the Milan Lakoseljac Cup.
8 Victorian clubs progressed to this stage. The 4 winners also qualified to the semi-finals of the Dockerty Cup.
4 Western Australian clubs progressed to this stage. The 2 winners also played in the Final of the Cool Ridge Cup.

Note: Blacktown City FC did not participate in the New South Wales qualifying rounds, as they had already qualified into the FFA Cup as 2015 National Premier Leagues champions.

Note: A-League Youth teams playing in their respective state leagues are specifically excluded from the preliminary rounds as their respective Senior A-League clubs are already part of the competition.

Key to Abbreviations

Qualifying round

Notes:
 w/o = Walkover
 † = After Extra Time
 VIC Byes – Chisholm United (8), Craigieburn City (8), Moreland Eagles (8), Old Ivanhoe Grammarians (8), Reservoir Yeti (8) and Shepparton South (9).

First round

Notes:
 w/o = Walkover
 † = After Extra Time
 NNSW Byes – Orara Valley (4).
 QLD Byes – Beerwah Glasshouse United (3), Coolum FC (3), Kawana FC (3), Maroochydore FC (3), Nambour Yandina (3) and Woombye FC (3).

Second round

Notes:
 w/o = Walkover
 † = After Extra Time
 NNSW Byes – Tamworth FC (4).
 QLD Byes – Brothers Townsville (3), Gold Coast Knights  (3), Rebels Gunners (3), Palm Beach Sharks (3), Saints Eagles South (3), Stratford Dolphins (3), Surfers Paradise Apollo (3) and Warwick Wolves (3).
 SA Byes – Fulham United (4) and Noarlunga United (4).

Third round

Notes:
 w/o = Walkover
 † = After Extra Time
 ACT Byes – ANU FC (3), Narrabundah FC (3), Queanbeyan City (3), Weston-Molonglo (3) and White Eagles (3).
 NSW Byes – Barden Ridgebacks (6), Cringila Lions (6), Normanhurst Eagles (6), Randwick City (6), Roselands Raptors (8), St Clair United (7), The Entrance Bateau Bay United (6) and West Pennant Hills Cherrybrook (6).
 NNSW Byes – Bangalow SC (4), Belmont Swansea United (3) and Coffs City United (4).
 NT Byes – Casuarina FC (2), Hellenic AC (2), Litchfield FC (3), Mindil Aces (3), Port Darwin (2), Shamrock Rovers Darwin (2) and University Azzurri (2).
 QLD Byes – Mackay Wanderers (3).

Fourth round

Notes:
 w/o = Walkover
 † = After Extra Time
 NT Byes – Alice Springs Celtic (2), Alice Springs Vikings (2) and Gillen Scorpions (2). 
 QLD Byes – Kawungan Sandy Straits (3).

Fifth round
164 teams took part in this stage of the competition, including 153 qualifiers from the previous round and 16 entering at this stage (11 from the NPL QLD (2)). The lowest ranked side that qualified for this round was Endeavour Hills Fire, the only level 7 team left in the competition.

Notes:
 † = After Extra Time
 NNSW Byes – Belmont Swansea United (3), Edgeworth Eagles (2), Singleton Strikers (3) and Thornton Redbacks (3).

Sixth round
A total of 84 teams competed in this round of the competition. The 42 victorious teams in this round qualified for the Seventh Round. The lowest ranked side that qualified for this round was Killarney Districts. They were the only level 6 team left in the competition.

Notes:
 w/o = Walkover
 † = After Extra Time

Seventh round
A total of 42 teams competed in this round of the competition. The 21 victorious teams in this round qualified for the 2016 FFA Cup Round of 32. The lowest ranked side that qualified for this round was Wagga City Wanderers. They were the only level 5 team left in the competition.

Notes:
 † = After Extra Time

References

External links
 Official website

FFA Cup preliminary
FFA Cup preliminary
Australia Cup preliminary rounds